Frank Andreasen (born 31 October 1975) is a former professional Danish darts player.

Career
Andreasen has been playing darts professionally since 2015, in which he won the Danish darts championship, beating Per Laursen in the finale. This victory ensured him a spot in the Winmau World Masters, in which he finished in the Last 80.

References

External links
 Profile at Darts Database

Danish darts players
Living people
People from Assens Municipality
British Darts Organisation players
1975 births
Sportspeople from the Region of Southern Denmark